Alexander King Dickson Jr. (August 11, 1876 – November 4, 1938) was an American college football coach, lawyer and banker. He served as the head football coach at Nevada State University—now known as the University of Nevada, Reno—for one season, in 1899, leading Nevada State to it second consecutive winning season, with a 3–2 record. The three wins were against the Pacific Tigers, and  San Jose Normal; the two losses were versus California and Stanford.  According to the 1901 yearbook Artemesia, "They (the team) were not strong enough to beat Berkeley or Stanford, but they scored a touchdown...(against) the latter."

Dickson graduated from the University of Pennsylvania in 1897 and the University of Pennsylvania Law School in 1901. He played football and baseball there. He began working for the Land Title Bank and Trust Company in 1909, holding the title of assistant vice president at the time of his death. Dickson died after suffering a heart attack on November 4, 1938.

Head coaching record

References

External links
 

1870 births
1938 deaths
19th-century baseball players
19th-century players of American football
American bankers
American football quarterbacks
Baseball pitchers
Baseball players from Philadelphia
Nevada Wolf Pack football coaches
Penn Quakers baseball players
Penn Quakers football players
Pennsylvania lawyers
Players of American football from Philadelphia
University of Pennsylvania Law School alumni